Astypalaea or Astypalaia was a town of ancient Greece on the island of Samos according to Stephanus of Byzantium, said by others to be either the acropolis of the city of Samos, or the name of half of the city.

The town is presumably on the mountain of the same name which modern scholars have located on Samos.

References

Populated places in the ancient Aegean islands
Former populated places in Greece
Samos